Mesodina is a genus of skipper butterflies in the family Hesperiidae.

Species
The genus includes the following species:

 Mesodina aeluropis Meyrick, 1901
 Mesodina hayi E.D. Edwards & Graham, 1995
 Mesodina halyzia Hewitson, 1868
 Mesodina cyanophracta Lower, 1911
 Mesodina gracillima E.D. Edwards, 1987

References
 Natural History Museum Lepidoptera genus database
 Mesodina at funet

Trapezitinae
Hesperiidae genera